The Liberty Independent School District is a public school district in Liberty, Texas (USA), based in Liberty, Texas. In addition to Liberty, the district serves the city of Ames and the unincorporated community of Moss Bluff. In 2009, the school district was rated "academically acceptable" by the Texas Education Agency.

The Liberty Independent School District has two elementary schools, one intermediate school, and one high school. The school colors are black and gold. Liberty is classified as a 4A by the UIL.

Schools

Elementary schools 
Liberty Elementary (Grades 2-5)
San Jacinto Elementary (Grades PK-1)

Intermediate schools
Liberty Middle School (Grades 6-8)

High schools
Liberty High School (Grades 9-12)

References

External links
Liberty ISD

School districts in Liberty County, Texas